The Imam Shamil Battalion, (Arabic: Katiba Al Imam Shamil, Russian: батальон имама Шамиля) is a militant Islamist organization primarily active in the North Caucasus. It is the Caucasian/Russian branch of Al-Qaeda.

The name of the group is most likely a reference to Imam Shamil, one of the first Muslim leaders in the Caucasus that fought the Russian Empire during the Caucasian War, and the third Imam of Caucasian Imamate.

History
It is unknown when the group was formed; however it did not rise to prominence until 26 April 2017, when it claimed responsibility for the 2017 Saint Petersburg Metro bombing. In its statement, it said that the attack was ordered by al-Qaeda's general Emir, Ayman al-Zawahiri, and that the group acts on behalf of al-Qaeda in the Caucasus and the Russian Federation. The attack was in retaliation to Russian military intervention in Syria. The group also pledged to continue launching terrorists attack in Russia until the Russian government withdraws its forces from the Caucasus and Syria. Is speculated that the group is led by Sirozhiddin Mukhtarov, who is also known as Abu Salah al-Uzbeky. In Tajikistan he is known for his connections with Uyghur terrorist groups such as the Turkistan Islamic Party and other al-Qaeda affiliates in Syria such as Tahrir al-Sham.

References

Branches of al-Qaeda
Jihadist groups
Paramilitary organizations based in Russia